The European High-Performance Computing Joint Undertaking (EuroHPC JU) is a public-private partnership in High Performance Computing (HPC), enabling the pooling of European Union–level resources with the resources of participating EU Member States and participating associated states of the Horizon Europe and Digital Europe programmes, as well as private stakeholders. The Joint Undertaking has the twin stated aims of developing a pan-European supercomputing infrastructure, and supporting research and innovation activities. Located in Luxembourg City, Luxembourg, the Joint Undertaking started operating in November 2018 under the control of the European Commission and became autonomous in 2020.

History 

In June 2016, EU Member State leaders, meeting in the European Council called for greater coordination of EU efforts on high-performance computing as part of the EU's wider Digital Single Market strategy. The European Declaration on High-Performance Computing was launched in Rome in March 2017, initially signed by seven EU Member States (France, Germany, Italy, Luxembourg, the Netherlands, Portugal and Spain) committed to upgrading European computing power. In June 2018, the Council of the EU endorsed the European Commission’s proposal to establish the EuroHPC Joint Undertaking. On 3 July 2018, the European Parliament voted in favour of the Commission’s proposal to create a European High Performance Computing Joint Undertaking. The proposal was formally adopted by the Council of the European Union on 28 September 2018.

The Executive Director was appointed on 15 May 2020 and the Joint Undertaking became autonomous from the European Commission on 23 September 2020.

The EuroHPC Joint Undertaking was reviewed by means of Council Regulation (EU) 2021/1173.

Funding and objectives 
The EuroHPC Joint Undertaking is jointly funded by its members with a budget of around €7 billion for the period 2021-2027.

Most of this funding comes from the current EU long-term budget, the Multiannual Financial Framework (MFF 2021-2027) with a contribution of €3 billion, distributed as follows:

 €1,9 billion from the Digital Europe Programme (DEP) to support the acquisition, deployment, upgrading and operation of the infrastructures, the federation of supercomputing services, and the widening of HPC usage and skills;
 €900 million from Horizon Europe (H-E) to support research and innovation activities for developing a world-class, competitive and innovative supercomputing ecosystem across Europe;
 €200 million from Connecting Europe Facility (CEF-2) to improve the interconnection of HPC, quantum computing, and data resources, as well as the interconnection with the Union’s common European data spaces and secure cloud infrastructures.

The EU contribution is matched by a similar amount from the participating countries. Additionally, private members are contributing an amount of €900 million.

The Joint Undertaking provides financial support in the form of procurement or research and innovation grants to participants following open and competitive calls.

The EuroHPC JU has the twin objectives of;
 developing a pan-European supercomputing infrastructure: buying and deploying in the EU at least two supercomputers that will be among the top 5 in the world and at least two other that would today rank in the global top 25 for Europe's private and public users scientific and industrial users, for use in more than 800 scientific and industrial application fields;

 supporting research and innovation activities: developing a European supercomputing ecosystem, stimulating a technology supply industry, and making supercomputing resources in many application areas available to a large number of public and private users, including small and medium-sized enterprises.

Supercomputers 

In June 2019, the EuroHPC JU governing board selected 8 sites for supercomputing centres located in 8 different EU Member States to host the new high-performance computing machines. The hosting sites will be located in Sofia (Bulgaria), Ostrava (Czech Republic), Kajaani (Finland), Bologna (Italy), Bissen (Luxembourg), Minho (Portugal), Maribor (Slovenia), and Barcelona (Spain). 3 of the 8 sites will host precursor to exascale machines (capable of executing more than 150 Petaflops, or 150 million billion calculations per second) that will be in the global top 5 supercomputers, and 5 petascale machines (capable of executing at least 4 Petaflops, or 4 million billion operations per second).

In 2022, the EuroHPC governing board selected a further 5 sites to host a new fleet of EuroHPC supercomputers, including the first European exascale supercomputer, to be located in Germany.

Discoverer 
"Discoverer", the EuroHPC supercomputer located in Bulgaria, was the third launched under the program on October 21, 2021. Located on the territory of the Bulgarian Science and Technology Park "Sofia Tech Park" in Sofia, Bulgaria. The cost is co-financed by Bulgaria and EuroHPC JU with a joint investment of € 11.5 million completed by Atos. Discoverer has a stable performance of 4.5 petaflops and a peak performance of 6 petaflops.

Vega 
The Slovenian "Vega" was the first of the EuroHPC JU supercomputers to be launched on 20 April 2021. The system, built by Atos, is located at the Institute of Information Science Maribor (IZUM) in Maribor, Slovenia. The Vega supercomputer was jointly financed by EuroHPC JU and the Institute of Information Science Maribor (IZUM) to the sum of €17.2 million euros. Vega has a stable performance of 6.9 petaflops and a peak performance of 10.1 petaflops.

MeluXina 
"Meluxina", Luxembourg's supercomputer, was the second to be launched under the programme on 7 June 2021. Located at the LuxProvide data centre in Bissen, Luxembourg, the €30.4 million euros system was completed by Atos, with the Luxembourg government paying for two thirds of the associated costs, and the European Commission contributing the rest. Meluxina has a stable performance of 10 petaflops and a peak performance of 15 petaflops. The system is named after Melusine — a figure of Luxembourg and European folklore.

LUMI 
The LUMI supercomputer is located in at CSC in Kajaani, Finland. The HPE Cray EX supercomputer is being supplied by Hewlett Packard Enterprise (HPE), with joint funding by EuroHPC and the LUMI Consortium. As of mid-2022, the LUMI-C partition is operational, with the LUMI-G partition expected to become operational by the end of 2022. With a measured High Performance Linpack (HPL) performance of 151,9 petaflops, LUMI ranked 3rd on the June 2022 edition of the TOP500 list of the most powerful supercomputers. Once fully operational, the system will have a theoretical peak performance of 550 petaflops.

Leonardo 
Located in the Technopole of Bologna, in Bologna, Italy, Leonardo is a pre-exascale supercomputer which will be installed in 2022. It is supplied by ATOS, based on a BullSequana XH2000 supercomputer and hosted by CINECA. Once fully operational, it is expected to be capable of executing over 250 petaflops.

MareNostrum5 
MareNostrum 5 will be located at the Barcelona Supercomputing Center in Barcelona, Spain. In 2022 it was announced that the system will be built by Atos. Once operational, MareNostrum 5 will be a top-of-the-range supercomputer, with an expected peak performance of 314 Petaflops.

New supercomputers 
In 2022, the EuroHPC Joint Undertaking announced a further five supercomputers coming soon to five European countries: 

 DAEDALUS hosted by the National Infrastructures for Research and Technology (GRNET) in Greece,
 LEVENTE hosted by the Governmental Agency for IT Development (KIFU) in Hungary,
 CASPIr hosted by the National University of Ireland Galway (NUI Galway) in Ireland,
 EHPCPL hosted by the Academic Computer Centre CYFRONET AGH (CYFRONET) in Poland,
 and JUPITER, the first European exascale supercomputer, will be hosted by the Jülich Supercomputing Centre in Germany.

Members 
The EuroHPC Joint Undertaking is composed of public and private members.

Public members 
As of July 2022, public members of the Joint Undertaking include, the European Union (represented by the European Commission), 26 of the 27 EU Member States (Austria, Belgium, Bulgaria, Croatia, Cyprus, the Czech Republic, Denmark, Estonia, Finland, France, Germany, Greece, Hungary, Ireland, Italy, Latvia, Lithuania, Luxembourg, Malta, the Netherlands, Poland, Portugal, Romania, Slovakia, Slovenia, Spain and Sweden), and five non-EU associated states of the EU's Horizon 2020 programme (North Macedonia, Norway, Montenegro, Serbia, and Turkey).

Other EU Member States or countries associated to Horizon 2020 are able to become members, provided that they accept the Statutes and financially contribute to the achievement of the objectives of the Joint Undertaking.

Observer states 
The United Kingdom lost its observer status following its departure from the EU on 31 January 2020.

Private members 
The Joint Undertaking's private members include the European Technology Platform for High Performance Computing (ETP4HPC), the European Quantum Industry Consortium (QuIC), and the Big Data Value (BDVA) associations. Any legal entity established in a Member State or country associated to Horizon 2020 that supports research and innovation may apply to become a private member of the Joint Undertaking.

Governance 
There are three bodies in the EuroHPC Joint Undertaking:

Governing board 
The governing board is composed of representatives of the EU and participating states. The European Commission and each participating state appoint one representative in the Governing Board. Each representative may be accompanied by one expert. The EU holds 50% of the voting rights through the European Commission representative. The rest of the voting rights are distributed among the participating states according to the following lines;
for the general administrative tasks of the Joint Undertaking, the voting rights of the participating states should be distributed equally among them;
for the tasks corresponding to setting up the work plan for the acquisition of supercomputers, the selection of the hosting entity and the research and innovation activities of the Joint Undertaking, the voting rights of the participating states that are EU Member States are based on the principle of qualified majority. Participating states that are not EU Member States hold voting rights for the tasks corresponding to the research and innovation activities;
for the tasks corresponding to the acquisition and operation of supercomputers, only those participating states and the EU that contribute resources to the procurement of petascale supercomputers and the total cost of ownership of pre-exascale supercomputers have voting rights proportional to their contribution.

Industrial and scientific advisory board 
The industrial and scientific advisory board consists of two Groups which provide independent advice to the Governing Board;
 the Research and Innovation Advisory Group (RIAG) identifies key research priorities. It is composed of no more than 12 members, where no more than six are appointed by the Private Members, and no more than six are appointed by the Governing Board;
 the Infrastructure Advisory Group (INFRAG) provides advice on the acquisition and operation of the petascale and pre-exascale supercomputers. It is composed of no more than 12 members appointed by the Governing Board.

Executive director 
The executive director is the chief executive responsible for day-to-day management of the Joint Undertaking. The position is currently held by Anders Dam Jensen.

Headquarters 

The EuroHPC Joint Undertaking is headquartered in the Drosbach Building, used by the European Commission, in the Luxembourg City quarter of Gasperich, Luxembourg.

See also 
 Digital Single Market
 HPC Europa
 Supercomputing in Europe

References

External links 
Official website
Luxembourg government video on EuroHPC

Joint undertakings of the European Union and European Atomic Energy Community
Information technology organizations based in Europe
Supercomputing in Europe
Science and technology in Europe
European Union organisations based in Luxembourg